Mimoun El Kadi (born 9 May 1987) is a Dutch former professional footballer.

External links
 Player profile at Voetbal International

1987 births
Living people
Dutch footballers
ADO Den Haag players
Footballers from The Hague
Association football midfielders